Aminu Kano Teaching Hospital is a Federal Government Teaching Hospital located in Kano State, Nigeria. It was formerly known as Bayero University Teaching hospital. The current chief medical director is Abdurrahman Abba Sheshe.

Aminu Kano Teaching Hospital serves three main functions: training of medical students and Resident doctors, provision of specialist medical services to the sick, and important research for the advancement of medical knowledge.

It is used for the training of Bayero University medical students and postgraduate medical doctors (Residency training).  
It recorded success over the years, including being the first government hospital to perform a successful kidney transplant in the year 2002,  the former Chief Medical Director Professor Abdulhamid Isa Dutse was instrumental in the transplant.

Chief executives
The Chief executive officer, referred to as the Chief Medical Director (CMD) is responsible for the day to day operations of the institution. The past CMDs are Professor Sadiq Suleiman Wali (a Physician: Gastroenterologist), Professor Abdulhamid Isa Dutse (a Physician: Clinical Haematologist/Oncologist), and Professor Aminu Zakari Muhammed (a Histopathologist). The current CMD, Professor Abdurahman Abba Sheshe (a Surgeon) was appointed in 2019.

Departments 
Aminu Kano Teaching Hospital has sixteen clinical departments: Internal Medicine, Paediatrics, Obstetrics and Gynaecology, Surgery, Ophthalmology, ENT, Dental and Maxillofacial surgery, Radiology, Histopathology, Chemical Pathology, Haematology and blood transfusion, and Medical microbiology.

References

Bayero University Kano
Teaching hospitals in Nigeria
Buildings and structures in Kano
Hospitals in Nigeria
Organizations based in Kano